"Dostoyevsky's Pushkin Speech" was a speech delivered by Fyodor Dostoyevsky in honour of the Russian poet Alexander Pushkin on  at the unveiling of the Pushkin Monument in Moscow. The speech is considered a crowning achievement of his final years and elevated him to the rank of a prophet while cementing his stature further as the greatest contemporary Russian writer.

The Pushkin Speech, which Dostoyevsky gave less than a year before his death, was delivered at the Strastnaya Square after a two-hour religious service at the monastery across the street.  The address praised Pushkin as a beloved poet, a prophet, and the embodiment of Russia's national ideals. There are some who note that the speech was not really about Pushkin but about Russia, and also Dostoyevsky himself.

References

External links

English translation of the speech

Works by Fyodor Dostoyevsky
Cultural depictions of Alexander Pushkin
1880s speeches